Events in the year 2020 in Paraguay.

Incumbents
 President: Mario Abdo Benítez 
 Vice President: Hugo Velázquez Moreno

Events 
11 September – Former vice-president Óscar Denis is kidnapped by rebels.
18 September – Authorities fear for the health of Denis, 74, after the indigenous man who was captured with him but then released tests positive for COVID-19.

Deaths

January 6 – Zacarías Ortiz Rolón, Roman Catholic bishop (b. 1934).
January 7 – Ana Lucrecia Taglioretti, violinist (b. 1995).
January 31 – César Zabala, 58, footballer (Cerro Porteño, Talleres, national team), bladder cancer.

References

 
2020s in Paraguay
Years of the 21st century in Paraguay
Paraguay
Paraguay